Ajmal Ameer is an Indian actor and former physician, who works in the Malayalam, Tamil, and Telugu film industries. He has won two Filmfare Awards South for his role Anjathe (2008) and Ko (2011).

Early and personal life
Ajmal  studied medicine in Vinnytsia, Ukraine. Ajmal has two brothers Askar and Abith.

Ajmal is married to Renju and they have a son.

Career 

Ajmal's lead debut film was Pranayakalam, opposite Vimala Raman. This was followed by the Tamil film Anjathe, directed by Myshkin, in which he played an angry young man. The film became a high critical as well as commercial success, with Ajmal receiving several awards for his performance. He next starred in the Malayalam film Madambi alongside Mohanlal. It remains his only hit in Malayalam aside from Loham and Two Countries. In 2009, he has gone on to do Tamils films like TN 07 AL 4777 and Thiru Thiru Thuru Thuru. He also acted in an international production in Malayalam De Nova, which went unnoticed. The anti-hero character, Vasanthan Perumal, he portrayed in the 2011 Tamil movie  Ko earned him a lot of appreciation. Based on an online poll conducted by The Times of India, Ajmal won the Chennai Times Film Award for Best Actor in a Negative Role Male. In 2012, he made his debut in the Telugu film Rachcha. His willingness to experiment and go beyond the image of the virtuous hero have garnered him a rich spectrum of characters from Tamil and Telugu.  In 2013, he played an independent cinematographer in the suspense thriller Bangles. He also did in Karuppampatti (2013) and Vetri Selvan (2014), which for lack of good publicity, bombed at the box office.

He also acted in the Telugu film Prabhajanam (2014) in which he played the Chief Minister of Andhra Pradesh. In 2015, He hasn't done any major roles in Malayalam and was seen in guest roles in Loham and Two Countries. In 2015, he acted in an  award-winning Malayalam movie Ben. Since then he had not been active in Malayalam, until 2022 when he played a police officer in the movie Pathaam valavu. However he's keeping himself busy in other film industries and has just completed Tamil movie, Iravukku Aayiram Kangal (2018) has him sharing screen with Arulnithi. In 2019, his Tamil films are also Chithiram Pesuthadi 2 and Devi 2. He is next seen in Nayanthara's film titled Netrikann (2021). The film directed by renowned Milind Rau Aval is produced by Vignesh Shivan. He is also part of Malayalam movie Kshanam.

Filmography

Accolades
 2008 - Nominated, Vijay Award for Best Debut Actor  -  Anjathe 
 2011 - Nominated, Vijay Award for Best Supporting Actor  -  Ko

References

External links 

 https://www.instagram.com/ajmal_amir/
 

Living people
Male actors from Kochi
Male actors in Tamil cinema
Indian male film actors
Male actors in Malayalam cinema
Filmfare Awards South winners
20th-century Indian medical doctors
Male actors in Telugu cinema
21st-century Indian male actors
People from Aluva